Aletris obovata (southern colicroot or white colic-root) is a plant species native to the southeastern United States (Mississippi, Alabama, Florida, and Georgia).

Aletris obovata grows in moist areas, such as pine woodlands and savannahs. It is a perennial herb up to 100 cm tall, with a long spike of small, cylindrical flowers. Flowers are usually white or cream-colored with brownish tips on the corolla lobes, the lobes bent inwards to give the flower an overall rounded, ovoid or obovoid (egg-shaped) shape with only a narrow opening at the tip. It is usually pollinated by butterflies.

References

External links
Phytoimages photos
Aletris Uses, Benefits & Dosage - Drugs.com Herbal Database
Henriette Kress, Henriette's Herbal Page

Nartheciaceae
Endemic flora of the United States
Flora of the Southeastern United States
Plants described in 1903